Fly by Night (Chinese: 非常盗, Malay: Sebelum Pagi Berakhir) is a 2018 Malaysian neo-noir crime thriller film. The film follows four taxi drivers who extort money from wealthy passengers. Things go wrong when one of them works with a victim, while an inspector and the criminal gang are in pursuit of them.

It received positive reviews. It was released on 11 April 2019 in Malaysia, Singapore and Brunei.

Synopsis 
In Kuala Lumpur, four taxi drivers run a low-profile extortion team by targeting passengers that they drive from the airport. They keep the scheme small, only blackmailing selected wealthy passengers. Among the drivers are two brothers, Tai Lo (Sunny Pang) and Sai Lo (Fabian Loo) who commit these crimes in order to pay off their debts. Things go wrong when the impulsive younger brother decides to work with one of their victims to blackmail her lover, while policeman Inspector Kamal and the criminal gang, hot on their heels are in pursuit of them. How far will they go?

Cast 
 Sunny Pang as Tai Lo, older brother
 Eric Chen as Ah Soon
 Fabian Loo as Sai Lo, younger brother
 Jack Tan as Gwai Lo
 Frederick Lee as Jared
 Bront Palarae as Inspector Kamal
 Joyce Harn
 Ruby Yap aka Ruby Faye as Michelle
 Shaun Chen
 Mike Chuah
 Pearlly Chua
 John Tan
 Ken Abdullah
 Sarah Lian
 Iedil Putra
 Sabrena Khalid
 Joko Anwar as Alan

Release 
The film is the theatrical director debut for Zahir Omar. The film had its world premiere at the 23rd Busan International Film Festival in October 2018. It was then screened at the 3rd International Film Festival and Awards Macao (IFFAM) and 2018 Jogja-NETPAC Asian Film Festival. In early 2019, it was selected to be screened at the 2019 New York Asian Film Festival and Santa Barbara International Film Festival. It received positive reviews.

References

External links 
 
 Fly By Night on Cinema.com.my
 Fly By Night on Popcorn Malaysia
 

Malaysian crime drama films
2010s Mandarin-language films
Malay-language films